The Solomon Roadhouse, also known as the Curran's Roadhouse, is a historic travel accommodation in northwestern Arctic Alaska. The roadhouse was built in 1904, during the days of the Nome Gold Rush, which brought many miners to the Solomon River as well, resulting in the establishment of the communities of Solomon and Dickson, and the construction of a railroad. After the gold rush declined and the communities were devastated by storms and floods, the roadhouse and other buildings were relocated about a mile north of the coast in the 1930s. The roadhouse operated until the 1970s.

The roadhouse was listed on the National Register of Historic Places in 1980.

See also
National Register of Historic Places listings in Nome Census Area, Alaska

References

Hotel buildings on the National Register of Historic Places in Alaska
Buildings and structures completed in 1939
Buildings and structures in Nome Census Area, Alaska
Buildings and structures on the National Register of Historic Places in Nome Census Area, Alaska
Relocated buildings and structures in Alaska